The 1980 USC Trojans football team represented the University of Southern California (USC) in the 1980 NCAA Division I-A football season. In their fifth year under head coach John Robinson, the Trojans compiled an 8–2–1 record (4–2–1 against conference opponents), finished in third place in the Pacific-10 Conference (Pac-10), and outscored their opponents by a combined total of 265 to 134.

Quarterback Gordon Adams led the team in passing, completing 104 of 179 passes for 1,237 yards with seven touchdowns and seven interceptions.  Marcus Allen led the team in rushing with 354 carries for 1,563 yards and 14 touchdowns. Hoby Brenner led the team in receiving with 26 catches for 315 yards and no touchdowns.

Schedule

Personnel

Game summaries

Minnesota
Marcus Allen 42 rushes, 216 yards

Arizona St

Marcus Allen 36 Rush, 133 Yds

Oregon

Washington
Marcus Allen 30 rushes, 216 yards

vs. UCLA

Notre Dame

Team players drafted into the NFL
 Ronnie Lott, 1st round, San Francisco 49ers
 Keith Van Horne, 1st round, Chicago Bears
 Dennis Smith, 1st round, Denver Broncos\
 Ray Butler, 4th round, Baltimore Colts
 Kevin Williams, 7th round, New Orleans Saints
 Jeff Fisher, 7th round, Chicago Bears
 Steve Busick, 7th round, Denver Broncos
 James Hunter, 9th round, Pittsburgh Steelers
 Eric Scoggins, 12th round, Baltimore Colts

Awards and honors
Former USC Trojans player Tay Brown, was inducted into the College Football Hall of Fame

References

USC
USC Trojans football seasons
USC Trojans football